Yitzhak Katznelson (born 1934) is an Israeli mathematician.

Katznelson was born in Jerusalem.  He received his doctoral degree from the University of Paris in 1956.  He is a professor of mathematics at Stanford University.

He is the author of An Introduction to Harmonic Analysis, which won the Steele Prize for Mathematical Exposition in 2002.

In 2012 he became a fellow of the American Mathematical Society.

References

External links
An Introduction to Harmonic Analysis

1934 births
Living people
Israeli mathematicians
Jewish American scientists
Mathematical analysts
Stanford University Department of Mathematics faculty
Fellows of the American Mathematical Society